The following lists roads in Toronto, Ontario, Canada, that do not follow the city grid, often referred to as contour roads or diagonal roads. They are listed by type of road, then alphabetically.

Arterial roads

Albion Road

Albion Road was created as a private road for French teacher Jean du Petit Pont de la Haye (1799–1872) to his estate in the area (the plank road was built in 1846 by Weston Plank Road Company from Musson's Bridge over Humber River to Bolton). Originally called Claireville, it was renamed for the Albion Township, which was the eastern third of the present-day (since 1973/1974) limits of Caledon. The road is located within Toronto, starting at the intersection of Weston Road and Walsh Avenue (continues eastward as Wilson Avenue) and heads northwest to Albion Road and Steeles (becoming Regional Road 50).

The beginning of the road is Walsh Avenue, a short connector between Albion Road and Wilson Avenue. The intersection at Weston Road and Walsh Avenue is a ramp with two traffic lights for Albion Road/Walsh Avenue and none for Weston Road.

Albion Road northwest of Highway 27 was formerly Highway 50, but later became Peel Regional Road 50 and Simcoe County Road 50. The northern end of Highway 50 is Ontario Highway 89 by the town of New Tecumseth in Simcoe County.

Albion Road is served by TTC route 73C and the southern section is served by route 118. Until 1990, the section was serviced by the 36 Finch West and 118 Finch via Allen Road (cancelled in 1996).

Danforth Road

Danforth Road is a historically related arterial street in Toronto. Danforth Road splits off Danforth Avenue west of Warden Avenue and runs diagonally northeast until south of Lawrence Avenue, where it continues as McCowan Road. McCowan Road itself ends at Baseline Road located in Georgina, which is the northernmost municipality in York Region.

The route is served by TTC route 113 Danforth from Danforth Aveune to Kennedy Road and the 16 McCowan from Eglinton Avenue to Lawrence Aveune, just before it turns into McCowan Road.

Kingston Road

Kingston Road is the southernmost major road along the eastern portion of Toronto, specifically in the district of Scarborough. Until 1998, it formed a portion of Highway 2. The name of the street is derived from Kingston, Ontario, as the road was the primary route used to travel from Toronto to the settlements east of it situated along the northern shores of Lake Ontario; in the west end of Kingston, this highway was referred to as the York Road (referring to the former name of Toronto) until at least 1908.
Due to its diagonal course near the shore of Lake Ontario, the street is the terminus of many arterial roads in eastern Toronto, both east–west and north–south, with a few continuing for a short distance after as minor residential streets. However, Lawrence Avenue continues as a major arterial for a considerable distance beyond it to the mouth of the Rouge River in West Rouge.

Kingston Road is served by Toronto Transit Commission routes 502/503/22A, 12, 102/902, 86/986 and 905.

Rexdale Boulevard

Rexdale Boulevard is a short east–west roadway in Rexdale, a neighbourhood in Toronto, and begins as a spur road off Islington Avenue just north of the 401. This spur originally began in the former village of Weston as a road northwest to what would later become Brampton, Ontario. The current road passes through a mostly light industrial stretch of north Etobicoke. West of Highway 427, Rexdale Boulevard becomes Derry Road and enters the city of Mississauga. Derry Road is also signed as Peel Regional Road 5, an east–west route that travels the entire length of the city of Mississauga and Peel Region as a whole. Derry Road is the northern boundary of Toronto Pearson International Airport. The intersection of Derry Road and Airport Road was once the site of Malton, itself a part of Mississauga. West of the intersection with Mavis Road, the road makes a large arc around the former village of Meadowvale. The bypassed stretch was renamed Old Derry Road and can also be seen in a small stretch of Syntex Crescent. Derry Road is named for the "lost village" of Derry West, which was located around the Hurontario Street and Derry Road intersection. Derry West was named after Derry in Northern Ireland and home of many settlers in the area.

West of Highway 407, Derry Road enters Halton Region as Halton Regional Road 7. This stretch of road is mainly rural except for the section between James Snow Parkway and Tremaine Road in Milton. After passing through another rural stretch, the road ends at Milburough Line in the town of Carlisle in Hamilton (formerly in Flamborough before amalgamating with Hamilton in January 2001).

The street is served by TTC bus route 37A, a branch of 37 Islington.

Collector roads

Chaplin Crescent

Chaplin Crescent is a diagonal street located in Toronto, Ontario. The street runs almost entirely just north and east of the Kay Gardner Beltline Park, a former railway meant to serve the community of Forest Hill (as well as Fairbank to the west), and primarily runs parallel to it. The street has several parks by it: Castlefield Parkette, Forest Hill Memorial Park, Robert Bateman Parkette, Larratt Parkette, and Oriole Park. At the southeast end of the street where it crosses Yonge Street over Davisville station and Line 1's Davisville Yard, it becomes Davisville Avenue.

Chaplin Crescent is served by TTC route 14 Glencairn. Chaplin station on Line 5 Eglinton is scheduled to open in 2023.

Dawes Road

Dawes Road is a spur of Victoria Park Avenue, and the original roadway through the Taylor-Massey Creek ravine. The road is named for Clem Dawes, a farmer on Lot 2 Concession 2 of York Township and later hotel owner. The street between Victoria Park Avenue and Pharmacy Avenue is an east–west road running just south of St. Clair Avenue. There is a  gap between the east–west Dawes Road and the diagonal Dawes Road. 

Dawes Road is served by TTC route 23 Dawes.

Trethewey Drive

Trethewey Drive, formerly named Holmstead Drive, was a private rural road on the land of mining magnate and owner of the Trethewey Model Farm William Griffith Trethewey (1865–1926). In 1910, the property became the site of Toronto's first airplane flight, with French ace Count Jacques de Lesseps circling the city. Trethewey Airfield, later renamed De Lesseps Field, hosted de Havilland's facilities and the Royal Canadian Air Force before the land was sold for development in 1941. The boroughs of North York and York later assumed control of the road.

The street is served by TTC route 32C Eglinton West (a branch of 32 Eglinton West) that was once part of the former route 83 until 1972 and will be served by TTC route 158 in 2023 after Line 5 Eglinton is opened for revenue service.

Vaughan Road

Vaughan Road is named after the Township (later City) of Vaughan, which in turn was named after Benjamin Vaughan, a British commissioner whose role was to smooth negotiations between Britain and the newly independent United States during the drafting of the Treaty of Paris in 1783. The street's original alignment led to the namesake township until the street was shortened. The neighbourhood of Oakwood–Vaughan (later officially renamed Oakwood Village for the main commercial strip on Oakwood Avenue at Rogers Road), as well as former high school Vaughan Road Academy, are named after this street. Vaughan Road's contour is the result of it being parallel to the buried Castle Frank Brook to the northeast.

Vaughan Road is served by TTC bus route 90. There are streetcar tracks on the road south of St. Clair Avenue to allow 512 St. Clair streetcars to use the depots located closer to the lakeshore by the rest of the TTC streetcar system.

See also

List of east–west roads in Toronto
List of north–south roads in Toronto

References

Diagonal roads